Kőszegi is a Hungarian surname. Notable people with the surname include:

 Diána Kőszegi (born 1983), Hungarian Go player
 György Kőszegi, Hungarian weightlifter
 Rodica Dunca or Rodica Dunca Kőszegi (born 1965), Romanian artistic gymnast
 Zoltán Kőszegi (born 1964), Hungarian politician
 Kőszegi family, a medieval Hungarian noble house from the kindred of Héder

Hungarian-language surnames